Karl Nitz (16 October 1932 - September 2020) was born in Człuchów, Eastern Pomerania, and a famous German judo athlete, who competed for the SC Dynamo Hoppegarten / Sportvereinigung (SV) Dynamo. He won a gold medal and two bronze medals at European Judo Championships and four national titles. He lived until his death in Berlin

References

External links 
 Sportclub Dynamo Hoppegarten - Club history
 European Judo Championships (men  – all categories)
 DDR Judo Championships (men -havyweight

1932 births
2020 deaths
German male judoka
People from Człuchów
People from the Province of Pomerania
20th-century German people
21st-century German people